3714 Kenrussell, provisional designation , is a Eunomian asteroid from the central regions of the asteroid belt, approximately  in diameter. It was discovered on 12 October 1983, by American astronomer Edward Bowell at the Anderson Mesa Station near Flagstaff, Arizona, in the United States. It was named for Australian astronomer Kenneth S. Russell. The presumably stony asteroid has a rotation period of 5.25 hours.

Orbit and classification 

Kenrussell is a member of the Eunomia family, a prominent family of stony asteroids and the largest one in the intermediate main belt with more than 5,000 identified members.

It orbits the Sun in the central asteroid belt at a distance of 2.1–3.0 AU once every 4 years and 1 month (1,499 days; semi-major axis 2.56 AU). Its orbit has an eccentricity of 0.18 and an inclination of 14° with respect to the ecliptic.

Physical characteristics 

Based on its family membership, Kenrussell is an assumed stony S-type asteroid.

Rotation period 

In December 2016, a rotational lightcurve of Kenrussell was obtained from photometric observations by French amateur astronomer Matthieu Conjat . Lightcurve analysis gave a well-defined rotation period of 5.2518 hours with a brightness amplitude of 0.28 magnitude.

Diameter and albedo 

According to the survey carried out by the NEOWISE mission of NASA's Wide-field Infrared Survey Explorer, Kenrussell measures 10.440 and 11.260 kilometers in diameter and its surface has an albedo of 0.1189 and 0.1057, respectively.

The Collaborative Asteroid Lightcurve Link assumes an albedo of 0.21 – derived from 15 Eunomia, the family's parent body – and calculates a diameter of 8.36 kilometers based on an absolute magnitude of 12.7.

Naming 

This minor planet was named after Australian astronomer Kenneth S. Russell, a long-time operator of the 1.2-metre UK Schmidt Telescope at the Siding Spring Observatory in Australia. The official naming citation was published by the Minor Planet Center on 31 May 1988 .

References

External links 
 Asteroid Lightcurve Database (LCDB), query form (info )
 Dictionary of Minor Planet Names, Google books
 Asteroids and comets rotation curves, CdR – Observatoire de Genève, Raoul Behrend
 Discovery Circumstances: Numbered Minor Planets (1)-(5000) – Minor Planet Center
 
 

003714
Discoveries by Edward L. G. Bowell
Named minor planets
19831012